Studio Stoops is a 1950 short subject directed by Edward Bernds starring American slapstick comedy team The Three Stooges (Moe Howard, Larry Fine and Shemp Howard). It is the 126th entry in the series released by Columbia Pictures starring the comedians, who released 190 shorts for the studio between 1934 and 1959.

Plot
The Stooges are exterminators mistaken for B.O. Pictures' publicity department. They are then instructed to drum up publicity for the studio's lovely new actress Dolly Devore (Christine McIntyre), and arrange a fake kidnapping.

However, two gangsters hear the Stooges' plan and kidnap Devore for real. The gangsters break into her hotel room, then tie her hands behind her back and zip her up in a large garment bag, forcing the Stooges to come to her rescue.

However, complications arise when Shemp walks out on the outdoor ledge (after switching places with Dolly inside the bag) having to hold on to the accordion arm of a telephone to keep from falling to his death. Dolly and the Stooges manage to create a rope long enough for Shemp to grab onto. The crooks return and force Dolly and Moe to surrender, but one of the crooks gets his leg hooked in the rope, allowing Dolly and Moe to knock the crooks out.

Meanwhile, Larry makes several attempts to get the cops involved, but they refuse to help, believing it to be a publicity stunt. As a last resort, Larry throws food at the cops, getting them to chase him back to the scene of the crime, just in time to arrest the criminals. Larry attempts to unhook the rope from the crook and almost falls out the window, but is saved by Moe. Shemp lands on a lady's balcony, and Moe and Larry fall into a bathtub filled with water. While it may not be Saturday night, the boys decide that they've got nothing to lose and take a bath.

Cast

Credited
 Moe Howard as Moe
 Larry Fine as Larry
 Shemp Howard as Shemp
 Christine McIntyre as Dolly Devore
 Kenneth MacDonald as Dandy Dawson
 Vernon Dent as Captain Casey

Uncredited
 Joe Palma as Louie
 Ted Stanhope as J. B. Fletcher
 Charles Jordan as Tiny
 Stanley Price as Brown
 Chuck Hamilton as Policeman
 Harold Kening as Detective 
 Richard Kening as Detective 
 Sara Honeywell as Woman on balcony

Production notes
Studio Stoops was filmed on February 22–25, 1949, but withheld from release until October 5, 1950, a total of 20 months.

The gag of Shemp hiding in a garment bag in the hotel room closet then managing to get out of the closet was adapted from Buster Keaton's 1941 short film So You Won't Squawk.

References

External links 

Studio Stoops at threestooges.net

1950 films
1950 comedy films
The Three Stooges films
Films directed by Edward Bernds
American black-and-white films
Columbia Pictures short films
American comedy short films
1950s English-language films
1950s American films